Güns or Guens may refer to:

 Kőszeg, Hungary 
 Kőszeg Mountains, Hungary
 Gyöngyös (river), Austria and Hungary, tributary of the Rába

People with the surname
 Akiva Güns (1761–1837), birth name of Akiva Eger, a Hungarian-Polish rabbi

See also 
 Guns (disambiguation)
 Gün, a surname